Sewer overflow can refer to:
 Combined sewer overflow
 Sanitary sewer overflow